The Thomas Willett was a fireboat operated by the FDNY.  She was launched in 1908 and retired in 1959. She was built as a steam-engine powered vessel with coal-fired boilers.  She was converted to oil-fired boilers in 1926.

Operational history
On August 14, 1927, a tugboat of the New York, New Haven and Hartford Railroad, towing two barges of railway rolling stock, collided with a train of rock barges towed by the Henry F. Wills.  The Thomas Willett responded, when one barge was sunk and others damaged, saving their crew.

The FDNY retired Thomas Willett in 1959 and put her up for public sale. She was acquired by Circle Line Sightseeing Cruises, who converted here into a tour boat and renamed her Circle Line XIV. As of 2021 she is extant in Morris Canal Basin, Jersey City, used as a floating office by Statue Cruises.

References

Fireboats of New York City
1908 ships
Ships built in Newburgh, New York